Georgios Kapnopoulos (born 26 September 1992) is a Greek footballer.

Career
Born in Kokkinokhoma, Kapnopoulos began his playing career with Kavala.

References

1992 births
Living people
Greek footballers
Panetolikos F.C. players
Association football midfielders
People from Kavala (regional unit)
Footballers from Eastern Macedonia and Thrace